Riksvei 163 (Rv163) runs between Skogskrysset in Lørenskog and Økern in Oslo. The road is 11 km, of which 1.2 km are in Akershus and 9.8 km in Oslo.

The road consists of Østre Aker vei (Oslo) and Lørenskogveien (Lørenskog). The road has four lanes until it meets the E6, but is not classed as a motorway.

163
Streets in Oslo
Roads in Lørenskog
Roads in Viken